Giles County is a county located in the U.S. state of Tennessee. As of the 2020 census, the population was 30,346. Its county seat is Pulaski.

History
Giles County is named after William Branch Giles, a Senator from Virginia who sponsored the admission of Tennessee as the sixteenth state into the Union. He also sponsored the building of the city and courthouse, which has burned four times. The current courthouse was built in 1909.  One of Giles County's local heroes is James McCallum, who served as Grandmaster of the Tennessee Masons, a member of the Confederate Congress, and mayor. He lived in Giles County for seventy years.

Until Maury County was established in November 1807, the area of the future Giles County was  part of Williamson County. Two years after the formation of Maury County, Giles County was created from southern Maury County on November 14, 1809, by an act of the State Legislature. Nearly half of the new county lay in Chickasaw territory until September 1816.

Geography

Adjacent counties
Maury County (north)
Marshall County (northeast)
Lincoln County (east)
Limestone County, Alabama (south)
Lauderdale County, Alabama (southwest)
Lawrence County (west)

Demographics

2020 census

As of the 2020 United States census, there were 30,346 people, 11,904 households, and 7,807 families residing in the county.

2000 census
As of the census of 2000, there were 29,447 people, 11,713 households, and 8,363 families residing in the county. The population density was 48 people per square mile (19/km2). There were 13,113 housing units at an average density of 22 per square mile (8/km2). The racial makeup of the county was 86.44% White, 11.80% Black or African American, 0.30% Native American, 0.35% Asian, 0.01% Pacific Islander, 0.21% from other races, and 0.89% from two or more races. 0.90% of the population were Hispanic or Latino of any race.

There were 11,713 households, out of which 31.40% had children under the age of 18 living with them, 55.80% were married couples living together, 11.90% had a female householder with no husband present, and 28.60% were non-families. 25.70% of all households were made up of individuals, and 11.20% had someone living alone who was 65 years of age or older. The average household size was 2.47 and the average family size was 2.96.

In the county, the population was spread out, with 24.50% under the age of 18, 8.30% from 18 to 24, 27.90% from 25 to 44, 24.80% from 45 to 64, and 14.50% who were 65 years of age or older. The median age was 38 years. For every 100 females there were 94.40 males. For every 100 females age 18 and over, there were 91.20 males.

The median income for a household in the county was $34,824, and the median income for a family was $41,714. Males had a median income of $31,221 versus $22,221 for females. The per capita income for the county was $17,543. About 9.00% of families and 11.70% of the population were below the poverty line, including 14.50% of those under age 18 and 14.80% of those age 65 or over.

Crime
On November 15, 1995, Giles County received minor notoriety after a shooting occurred at Richland High School in the community of Lynnville. A senior student named Jamie Rouse shot two teachers and a student in the north entrance of the school. One teacher (Carolyn Foster) and the student (Diane Collins) were killed, while teacher Carolyn Yancey was wounded in the crime. Rouse was convicted of the shooting and sentenced to life in prison without parole.

In 2000, there were 1,268 arrests made in Giles County, with 781 arrests in the city of Pulaski. One homicide occurred in that year. Based on a 2003 recording conducted by the Uniform Crime Report, the delinquency rate dropped to 71 arrests being made, with 8.8 percent of the county population being arrested that year. No homicides occurred in Giles County in 2003.

Transportation

Airport

Abernathy Field is a public use airport owned by Giles County and the City of Pulaski. It is located three nautical miles (6 km) southwest of the central business district of Pulaski.

Communities

Cities
 Ardmore (partial)
 Elkton
 Minor Hill
 Pulaski (county seat)

Town
 Lynnville

Unincorporated communities

 Aspen Hill
 Aymett Town
 Beech Hill
 Berea
 Campbellsville
 Five Points
 Frankewing
 Goodspring
 Liberty Hill
 Olivet
 Prospect
 Waco
 Weakley

Politics

Although historically part of overwhelmingly Democratic and secessionist Middle Tennessee, Giles County has, like much of the rural white South, become overwhelmingly Republican since 2000 due to opposition to the Democratic Party's liberal views on social issues.

Notable people
 Aaron V. Brown, Governor of Tennessee from 1845 to 1847; resident of Giles County, Tennessee.
 Neill S. Brown, Governor of Tennessee from 1847 to 1849; born in Giles County.
 John C. Brown, Governor of Tennessee from 1871 to 1875; born in Giles County.
 Cully Cobb, Southern agriculture pioneer and publisher, editor of Progressive Farmer
 Walter Herschel Beech, co-founder of Beechcraft Aircraft; born in Giles County.
 John Crowe Ransom, educator, scholar, literary critic, poet, essayist and editor; born in Giles County.
 James McCallum, Grandmaster of the Tennessee Masons, a member of the Confederate Congress, and mayor. He lived in Giles County for 70 years.
 James David Vaughan, music teacher, composer, song book publisher, the founder of the Vaughan Conservatory of Music and the James D. Vaughan Publishing Company; born in Giles County.
 Archibald Wright, Justice of the Tennessee Supreme Court from 1858 to 1885; raised in Giles County.

See also
National Register of Historic Places listings in Giles County, Tennessee

References

External links

 Official site
 Giles County Chamber of Commerce
 Giles County, TNGenWeb – genealogy resources

 
1809 establishments in Tennessee
Populated places established in 1809
Middle Tennessee